Rangeline Road Bridge is a historic Camelback Through Truss bridge that spans the Wabash River in Huntington Township, Huntington County, Indiana. It was built in 1913 by the Lafayette Engineering Co. of Lafayette, Indiana. It consists of two steel truss spans, each 128 feet long and 21 feet deep at mid-span.

It was listed on the National Register of Historic Places in 1998.

References

Truss bridges in the United States
Road bridges on the National Register of Historic Places in Indiana
Bridges completed in 1913
Transportation buildings and structures in Huntington County, Indiana
National Register of Historic Places in Huntington County, Indiana
Steel bridges in the United States